Southport & District Reform Synagogue, also known as Sha'arei Shalom ("Gates of Peace"), is a Reform Jewish congregation at the corner of Princes Street and Portland Street, Southport, in the Metropolitan Borough of Sefton, Merseyside, England. The congregation was formed in 1948 as Southport New Synagogue and has been associated with the Movement for Reform Judaism since 1949. It celebrated its 70th anniversary in 2018.

The synagogue publishes a newsletter, L'Chayim.

See also
 List of Jewish communities in the United Kingdom
 Movement for Reform Judaism

References

External links
Official website

1948 establishments in England
20th-century synagogues
Buildings and structures in Southport
Reform synagogues in the United Kingdom
Religion in Merseyside
Religious organizations established in 1948